The Red Sea International Film Festival is a film festival launched in 2019 and held in Jeddah, western Saudi Arabia. The festival mainly focuses on new storytelling trends, as well as emerging talents from Saudi Arabia, the Arab world and the rest of the Global South. The festival looks at establishing a solid foundation for the film industry in Saudi Arabia that may contribute to diversifying the income of the country. The first edition of the festival was held in the old town of Jeddah from the 6th of December to the 15 December 2021. The second edition of the festival will be held between the 1st and the 10th of Dec 2022, and will feature  the best films from Saudi Arabia, the region and a curated selection of titles from around the world.

Organization 
The festival is organized and operated by the Red Sea Film Festival Foundation, a non-profit cultural organization registered in Saudi Arabia. The Foundation is chaired by Jomana Alrashid; Chief Executive Officer (CEO) of the Saudi Research and Media Group – SRMG."

Festivals

2021 edition 
2021 edition of the festival was opened on 6 December 2021 with Joe Wright’s Cyrano at Jeddah, Saudi Arabia. 138 films from 67 countries will be screened in the festival, which includes 16 films in competition section. It closed on 15 December with the world premiere of Kabir Khan‘s film 83. The event came after several boycott calls by the critics, who warned that the Saudi authorities were attempting to divert the international attention from the country's poor human rights records. The Kingdom was being accused of using culture to whitewash its image at a global level. One of the critics said that without freedom of speech, the festival descended into a propaganda.

Red Sea Competition
 Brighton 4th, dir: Levan Koguashvili
 Communion, dir: Nejib Belkadhi
 PAKA (River of Blood), dir: Nithin Lukose
 Huda's Salon, dir: Hany Abu-Assad
 Soula, dir: Salah Issaad
 Europa, dir: Haider Rashid
 Yuni, dir: Kamila Andini
 Saloum, dir: Jean Luc Herbulot
 Rupture, dir: Hamzah Jamjoom
 Rehana Maryam Noor, dir: Abdullah Mohammad Saad
 Hit the Road, dir: Panah Panahi
 Life Suits Me Well, dir: Al Hadi Ulad-Mohand
 Neighbours, dir: Mano Khalil
 Farha, dir: Darin J Sallam
 Sharaf, dir: Samir Nasr
 The Alleys, dir: Bassel Ghandour
 Winners

Best Film: Brighton 4th by Levan Koguashvili – Georgia, Russia, Bulgaria, USA, Monaco.

Best Director: Europa by Haider Rashid – Iraq, Italy, Kuwait
Jury Prize: Hit the Road by Panah Panahi – Iran
Best Actor: Adam Ali for Europa – Iraq, Italy, Kuwait
Best Actress: Arawinda Kirana for Yuni – Indonesia, Singapore, France, Australia
Best Saudi Film: Rupture by Hamzah K. Jamjoom – Saudi Arabia
Audience Award: You Resemble Me by Dina Amer – Egypt, France, U.S.
Immersive Silver Yusr: Samsara by Hsin-Chien Huang – Taiwan
Immersive Gold Yusr: End of Night by David Adler – Denmark, France
Short Competition Golden Yusr: Tala’Vision by Murad Abu Eisheh – Jordan, Germany
Special Mention: Farha by Darin J. Sallam – Jordan
Best Cinematic Contribution: Amin Jafari for Hit the Road – Iran
Best Screenplay: Neighbours by Mano Khalil – Syria, Switzerland

See also 
 El Gouna Film Festival

References

External links 
 

2019 establishments in Saudi Arabia
Film festivals established in 2019
Film festivals in Saudi Arabia
Annual events in Saudi Arabia
Impact of the COVID-19 pandemic on cinema
Tourist attractions in Jeddah
Culture in Jeddah